Nessuno ha tradito (also known as Il ponte della concordia) is a 1952 Italian melodrama film directed by Roberto Bianchi Montero.

Plot

Cast
 Virginia Belmont as Laura
 Aldo Silvani as Colombo 		
 Roberto Risso as Bruno 		
 Vincenzo Musolino as Sandro		
 Laura Redi as Bruno's Sister 	 		
 Leopoldo Valentini as Priest 			
 Sandro Ruffini   	
 Renato Chiantoni  
 Marco Guglielmi

References

External links
 

1952 films
1950s Italian-language films
Films directed by Roberto Bianchi Montero
Italian drama films
1952 drama films
Melodrama films
Italian black-and-white films
1950s Italian films